The Thomas Lambert House is a historic colonial First Period house in Rowley, Massachusetts, United States. It was listed on the National Register of Historic Places in 1990.

See also
List of the oldest buildings in Massachusetts
National Register of Historic Places listings in Essex County, Massachusetts

References

Houses completed in 1699
Houses in Rowley, Massachusetts
Houses on the National Register of Historic Places in Essex County, Massachusetts
1699 establishments in Massachusetts